The Toi Pōneke Arts Centre (61–69 Abel Smith Street, Te Aro, Wellington), is the New Zealand capital's creative production facility and support complex. It was established between 2003 and 2005, and was formally opened by Mayor Kerry Prendergast in July 2005. For twelve years previous, the city's arts centre had been based at the much smaller Oriental Bay Rotunda. The new complex, spread across two buildings and seven floors, has a focus on active creative production in all disciplines, and on the further advancement of cultural identity in New Zealand. It is located in the bustling and dynamic Upper Cuba Street neighbourhood of Wellington.

The arts centre houses a combination of 29 artist studios, rehearsal spaces, music rooms, and administrative offices. It is home to over a dozen producers, festivals, or arts organisations, including Cuba Street Carnival, the New Zealand Fringe Festival, Dance Aotearoa NZ, Sticky Pictures, and Arts Access Aotearoa. Other cultural concerns based at the facility include Wellington Photographic Society, Acoustic Routes, Empress Stiltdance, Shakespeare Globe Centre NZ, and Storytellers Cafe. There are nearly 40 visual artists working from the two floors of studio space, and the ground floor contains workshop space and a gallery which presents 15–20 exhibitions each year.

The Wellington Arts Centre supports emerging and early-career artists and new projects, serves advanced creative people and established organisations, and offers community arts opportunities for the general public. There is a small staff based at the facility, including the city's Arts Programmes & Services Manager, Eric Vaughn Holowacz. The team has helped engineer new initiatives and creative projects such as Drive by Art, Opening Notes, the Artsplash Festival, and Wellington's Public Art Programme. Holowacz and staff also advise on project and audience development, collaborations and partnerships, resources and technical matters, and marketing. The Wellington Arts Centre reception desk is staffed Monday through Saturday, but the facility is in use around the clock.

In July 2006, after its first year of operation, the Wellington Arts Centre was renamed Toi Pōneke, a Māori language phrase for "Art of Wellington". Toi Pōneke - Wellington Arts Centre is regularly used by artists, musicians, theatre people, instructors, and producers. In an economic report to the city council Toi Pōneke is rated as valuable to the city.

References

External links
Arts Centre Gallery link

Buildings and structures in Wellington City
Arts centres in New Zealand
Tourist attractions in Wellington City